Dimitris Papamichael (1934–2004) was a popular Greek actor and director. In 1965, he married Aliki Vougiouklaki, the so-called "national star" of Greece. The star couple remained married for a decade, co-starring in several films that marked the "golden era" of Greek cinema.

Selected filmography
The Auntie from Chicago (1957)
A Matter of Dignity (1957)
Astero  (1959)
To Ksilo Vgike Ap' Ton Paradiso  (1959)
I Aliki Sto Nautiko (1960)
Never on Sunday (1960)
Madalena  (1960)
Chtipokardia Sto Thranio  (1963)
The Red Lanterns (1963)
Oh! That Wife of Mine  (1967)
Ipolochagos Natassa (1971)
Papaflessas (1971)
Erastes tou oneirou  (1974)

References

External links

1934 births
2004 deaths
Greek male film actors
Greek male stage actors
Greek film directors
20th-century Greek male singers
Male actors from Athens